Cameron Lionel Murphy AM (born 30 March 1973) is an Australian barrister, civil libertarian and Labor Party political candidate.

Murphy is a member of the New South Wales Bar Association and is admitted as a lawyer in NSW. He specialises in Industrial Law, Workplace Health & Safety, Administrative Law and Intellectual Property Law. He is best known for his role as the President of the NSW Council for Civil Liberties from 1999-2013 and was endorsed as the ALP candidate in the seat of East Hills for the March 2015 and March 2019 NSW state elections, which he narrowly lost. He is endorsed in the number 3 position on the ALP ticket for the NSW Legislative Council at the 2023 NSW state election.

Personal and early life

Murphy is the son of former Attorney-General and High Court Justice, Lionel Murphy and Ingrid Gee (née Grzonkowski). Murphy has two siblings, a half sister Lorel and a brother Blake.
Murphy was educated at Macquarie University where he graduated with a Bachelor of Arts and a Bachelor of Laws. He is married to Agatha and has two children, a son and a daughter.

Career

Murphy was an intern under the Australian Council of Trade Unions 'Organising Works' program in its inaugural year, 1994, where he trained in recruitment and organising of workers. He was placed as an Organiser with the Forestry Division of the Construction, Forestry, Mining and Energy Union and upon graduation he continued to work there from 1994-1997 becoming an Industrial Officer in 1996-1997.

President, NSW Council for Civil Liberties, 1999-2013. 
 
Statutory Board Member, Anti-Discrimination Board of NSW, 2003-2009.

Member, Consumer, Trader and Tenancy Tribunal of New South Wales, 2003-2008.

Trustee, Lionel Murphy Foundation, 2004–present.

Operations Manager, International Underwriting Services Pty Ltd, 2008-2011.

Director of Employee Benefits, Coverforce Pty Ltd,  2011-2014.

Member, Australian Labor Party National Policy Forum, 2012–Present.

Board Member, Light on the Hill Society, 2015–Present.

Barrister at Denman Chambers 2016–Present. Murphy practices in Employment/Industrial, Administrative and Human Rights Law.

Political career

In 2012, Murphy stood as a candidate in the NSW Labor Party's trial community preselection for the Lord Mayor of the City of Sydney. He was unsuccessful, with Linda Scott winning the community preselection.

In 2012, he stood as a candidate in the rank and file ballot for the ALP National Policy Forum on a human rights platform and he was elected as one of only six rank and file representatives from NSW. In 2016, he was re-elected for a second three-year term with the second-highest vote tally of the five NSW candidates elected.

In 2014, Murphy was preselected as the Labor candidate for the state electorate of East Hills, defeating Nicole Campbell in a rank and file preselection by 103 votes to 61 (weighted up to 73.2 under the ALP rules affirmative action weighting for female candidates). He was narrowly defeated by the sitting Liberal Party member at the 2015 New South Wales state election

In February 2017, he was preselected once again, unopposed, as the Labor candidate for East Hills at the 2019 New South Wales state election. Murphy again was narrowly defeated in the 2019 State Election for Electoral district of East Hills losing by just 429 votes.

In 2022, Murphy ran for preselection for the NSW Legislative Council within the Socialist Left Faction of the Labor Party. He came fourth behind Rose Jackson, John Graham and Mich Veitch after a number of his voters were excluded from participating in the ballot.
 He then nominated at the NSW State Labor Conference for a position on the NSW Legislative Council ticket, running against the factional tickets. The previously excluded voters in the Left factional ballot were able to participate at the ALP State Conference. He was successful and was preselected at the number 3 position on the Labor ticket for the NSW Legislative Council at the 2023 NSW State Election.

Awards
In 2013, Murphy was a finalist for the Australian Human Rights Commission Human Rights Awards 2013 in the "Community (Individual) Award - Tony Fitzgerald Memorial Award" category.

In 2013, Murphy was made an Honorary Life Member of the NSW Council for Civil Liberties.

In 2014, he was made a Member of the Order of Australia (AM) for his significant service to the community through a range of human rights and civil liberty organisations.

External links
Cameron Murphy's Personal Website
NSW Council For Civil Liberties Website
The Lionel Murphy Foundation 
Padstow resident Cameron Murphy AM confirmed for East Hills candidate for NSW ALP
Canterbury-Bankstown residents meet NSW Labor leader John Robertson to discuss government budget
Six Canterbury-Bankstown residents make Queen’s Birthday honours list

References

Living people
Australian barristers
Members of the Order of Australia
Macquarie University alumni
1973 births
People from Sydney